Kato is both a given name and a surname. Notable people with the name include:

People with the given name
Kato Khandwala (died 2018), American record producer and audio engineer
Kató Lomb, Hungarian interpreter
Kato Serwanga (born 1976), American football player
Kato Kaelin, an American radio and television personality

People with the surname

Ameril Umbra Kato, Filipino fighter
David Kato, Ugandan activist
, Japanese politician
Sergio Kato (born 1960), Brazilian-American actor

Fictional characters
Kato Fransen, the main character of the fourth season of the Belgian series wtFOCK.
Kato Hoeven, the victim in the Belgian noir TV series Beau Séjour

See also
Cato (disambiguation)

Japanese-language surnames